Libardón is one of 13 parishes (administrative divisions) in the Colunga municipality, within the province and autonomous community of Asturias, in northern Spain.

The population is 232 (INE 2004).

Villages
 Carrandena
 Eslabayo
 Fano
 Libardón
 Raicedo

References

Parishes in Colunga